Sanda ware (三田焼 Sanda-yaki) is a type of Japanese pottery.

The pottery kiln opened around the middle of the Edo period and was completed during the Kansei era by Uchida Chūbe (内田忠兵衛 1789–1840). During the Bakumatsu years, Kinkodō Kisuke (欽古堂亀祐 1765–1837) was invited from Kyoto and led the kiln to a prosperous era.

References

External links 

Japanese pottery